Capital City Airport  is a public use airport located one nautical mile (1.85 km) southwest of the central business district of Frankfort, a city in Franklin County, Kentucky, United States. This airport is owned by the Commonwealth of Kentucky. It is used entirely for general aviation and military aviation.

Facilities and aircraft
It has one asphalt paved runway designated 7/25 which measures 5,900 by 100 feet (1,798 x 30 m).

For the 12-month period ending March 8, 2007, the airport had 34,200 aircraft operations, an average of 93 per day: 88% general aviation, 9% air taxi and 3% military. At that time there were 71 aircraft based at this airport: 75% single-engine, 14% multi-engine and 11% helicopter.

References

External links
 Capital City Airport, official site
 Aerial photo as of 11 March 1997 from USGS The National Map
 

Airports in Kentucky
Buildings and structures in Frankfort, Kentucky
Transportation in Franklin County, Kentucky